Gunlock is an unincorporated community in western Washington County, Utah, United States, north of Gunlock State Park.

Description
The community lies on the Santa Clara River, northwest of the Red Mountains along local roads, northwest of the city of St. George, the county seat of Washington County. Although Gunlock is unincorporated, it has a post office, with the ZIP code of 84733.

History

Gunlock was first settled in 1857 by William "Gunlock Will" Hamblin, a pioneer settler and brother of Jacob Hamblin. During a visit to the site later that year George Albert Smith (an LDS Church general authority) named the community in honor of its first settler. In 1862, following severe flooding on the Santa Clara River at the community's former site, the original settlement was moved north to its present location.

In 1881 an adobe church/schoolhouse was completed; although classes were held in the building prior to its completion. That building was replaced by another church/schoolhouse in 1912. After several renovations over more than a century since its completion, the second building now serves as the Gunlock town hall.

Events
Gunlock is the site of the Annual Gunlock Rodeo.  The Rodeo is held traditionally on or around the 4th of July. This event has been held in Gunlock annually since 1945 and revenue from the event helps support community facilities.

See also

References

External links

 Gunlock, Utah on the Washington County Historical Society website

Unincorporated communities in Washington County, Utah
Unincorporated communities in Utah
Populated places established in 1857